One is an Angela Aki's first mini-album. It was her debut Japanese language release, under the independent Virgo Music Entertainment label. The album features three original compositions and three cover songs (with the cover songs' lyrics being rewritten into Japanese by Aki herself). The entire album is in Japanese except for the song "Warning". It debuted at #2 in the HMV's indies charts and by the end of the year it had reached #1. The song "Aisuru Mono" was used as the Hitachi DVD Cam CM song.

Track listing

Charts
One - Oricon Sales chart (Japan)

References

External links
Official discography 

2005 EPs
Angela Aki albums
Japanese-language EPs